RAVeL or in  (in ) is a Walloon initiative aimed at creating a network of itineraries reserved for pedestrians, cyclists, horse riders and people with reduced mobility, initiated at the end of the 1980s and connecting major cities and secondary municipalities of Wallonia through over  of pathways.

The network makes use of towpaths on river banks and disused railway or vicinal tramway lines. Old railway lines have been leased by the Government of Wallonia for 99 years using emphyteutic lease contracts. Where necessary, new paths are created to link independent parts of the network together.

History

Large parts of this network were disused after the war, with the development of road infrastructure and the preference for private cars. Concurrently, towing paths along rivers were made obsolete by new, motorized boats.

In 1977, the Belgian Ministry of Public Works bought a large section of former SNCB line 142 between Hoegaarden and Eghezée, and converted a first section (in Jodoigne) into a pedestrian/cyclist path in 1985.

During the same period, other similar conversions of old railway lines are carried out in various parts of Belgium. The RAVeL project was initiated in 1995 and the first section opened in 1996, between Rochefort and Villers-sur-Lesse. The project has the benefit of coordinating the various conversions to form a coherent, Wallonia wide network.

A 4 December 1997 ministerial order, aimed at classifying Walloon public roads into functional categories, provides an official status to the RAVeL network.

Characteristics

Asphalt or concrete paths wherever possible
Renovation of bridges, tunnels and other infrastructure along the paths
Creation of access points such as stairs and ramps
Creation of rest areas along the paths
Secure road crossings
Specific signage

Network structure

The RAVeL network is divided into:

 A backbone of five long distance itineraries, numbered from 1 to 5.
 A set of local, shorter sections, generally named after the number of the former railway line they follow.

Additionally, sections earmarked for RAVeL conversion, with basic equipment but not yet to RAVeL standard, are labelled Pré-RAVeL.

The RAVeL is connected to similar networks in adjacent regions (Flanders and Brussels) and countries (France, Luxembourg, Germany and Netherlands).

References

External links
Official site (French)
Official map (French)

Tourist attractions in Wallonia
National cycling route networks